Business and management research is a systematic inquiry that helps to solve business problems and contributes to management knowledge. It Is an applied research.

Four factors (Easterby-Smith, 2008)  combine to make business and management a distinctive focus for research :

 Transdiscipline approach
 Information access is difficult since managers see information as competitive advantage on the market
 Managers are educated and want some information produced by the classical research method 
 Finding must resolve practical management problems

Managers often need information of high quality to help them to make the right decision.

Research process
 Define and clarifying a research topic
 Literature review on this subject
 Research Philosophies
 Formulate research design
 Ethics and access to information
 Defining a sample 
 Using Secondary data
 Collecting primary
 data through observations, questionnaires and interview
 Analysing data 
 Draw conclusions from data analysis
 Basic research 
 Applied Research

Magazines & Unions
 Journal of Management Studies
 Global business research association at http://grbn.org/about/our-members/

See also

 Research
 Market research

Sources 
 Saunders, M.N.K., Lewis, P., Thornhill, A. (2012) Research Methods for Business Students (6th edition), Harlow, England: Pearson Education, Inc. 
 Ghauri, P., & Grønhaug, K. (2002), Research Methods in Business Studies : A Practical Guide (2nd edition), London: FT Prentice Hall Europe. 
 Easterby-Smith, M., Thorpe, R., Jackson, P.R. (2008) Management Research (3rd edition). London: Sage. [Chapter 1 explains what is management research.]
 Casse, C., & Lee, B. (eds) (2011) Challenges and Controversies in Management Research. New York, NY: Routledge.

Economics research
Business analysis